Pseudocroniades is a Neotropical genus of firetips in the family Hesperiidae. The genus is monotypic. The single species Pseudocroniades machaon, the yellow-banded skipper, is found only in Brazil.

References

Pseudocroniades - Natural History Museum Lepidoptera genus database

External links
images representing Pseudocroniades at Consortium for the Barcode of Life

Hesperiidae
Hesperiidae of South America
Hesperiidae genera